David Ehrhart is a retired United States Air Force brigadier general and lawyer. In June 2017, he was nominated by President Donald Trump to become General Counsel of the Air Force. The nomination was withdrawn in September 2017.

Biography
Ehrhart is a graduate of the United States Air Force Academy, the University of Utah, and Creighton University School of Law.

He served for 33 years in the United States Air Force, retiring as a brigadier general. While in the Air Force, Ehrhart completed tours as staff judge advocate for the Air Force Materiel Command's headquarters and as assistant judge advocate general for military law and operations for the Air Force's headquarters. He also served as commander of the Air Force Legal Services Agency, staff judge advocate at the Air Force's European headquarters, and commandant of the Air Force Judge Advocate General School.

Ehrhart served as associate general counsel at Lockheed Martin Aeronautics, where he was the lead attorney responsible for the F-35 program. He was previously the chief counsel of global sustainment for Lockheed Martin Aeronautics.

References

Living people
United States Air Force Academy alumni
University of Utah alumni
Creighton University School of Law alumni
21st-century American lawyers
United States Air Force generals
Lockheed Martin people
Year of birth missing (living people)